Mohamad Muslim bin Ahmad (born 25 April 1989) is a Malaysian professional footballer who plays for and captains Malaysia Super League club Sri Pahang as a centre-back.

Club career

Terengganu
Muslim Ahmad left Harimau Muda A to return to his home team Terengganu as the defender prepares to combine the chase for domestic honours with a glittering international career. Having established himself with the national team, the 22-year-old Muslim felt the time is right to leave the sheltered life at Wisma FAM and embark on a new path in his career. Muslim, who has two Sea Games gold medals and an AFF Cup winners' medal in his collection, now aims to help FA Cup winners Terengganu advance past the first round of the AFC Cup, win the Super League and Malaysia Cup when the new season starts.

Muslim made his first league debut against Perak. The match ended with Terengganu suffer a narrow defeat 1–0. Muslim plays his first AFC Cup match against Vietnamese side, Sông Lam Nghệ An. Terengganu marks the first win on the AFC Cup debut with 1–0 wins. On 22 August 2012, Muslim made his Malaysia Cup debut against Kelantan. Muslim help Terengganu to open their campaign with a shocking victory 2–0.

On 19 September 2012, Muslim left Terengganu after being released by the club.

Johor Darul Ta'zim
On 4 November 2012, Malaysia Super League club, Johor Darul Ta'zim confirmed that Muslim would join the club. He made his debut against Pelita Bandung Raya in a friendly match. Muslim scored in his debut after being assisted by teammate Simone Del Nero. He plays another friendly game against Woodlands Wellington with 5–1 win.

PDRM
Muslim signed with PDRM for the 2015 season but was released at the end of the league campaign.

Kelantan
On 5 December 2015, Muslim was revealed as Kelantan's new player for 2016 season.

Sri Pahang
On 15 January 2017, Muslim signed a contract with Sri Pahang. At Sri Pahang Muslim serves as the club's captain.

International career
Muslim began his career with playing for Harimau Muda A. He is the captain of Harimau Muda A. Muslim Ahmad is a Malaysian national football player. He has played for the Malaysia national football team, and in summer 2009 he played twice against Manchester United in their pre season tour of the Far East.

Muslim and 25 other players, who play for Harimau Muda A, were chosen to participate in a training camp in Slovakia. During his time in the training camp, Muslim and his teammate, Gary Steven Robbat were given a trial from the Slovakian team FC ViOn Zlaté Moravce on 30 March. FC ViOn Zlaté Moravce Coach Ľubomír Moravčík Promised Muslim and Gary a professional contract for the next 2010–2011 season. Later, FC ViOn Zlaté Moravce lost interest in Muslim and Gary due to internal problems in the club.

In November 2010, Muslim was called up to the Malaysia national squad by coach K. Rajagopal for the 2010 AFF Suzuki Cup. Malaysia won the 2010 AFF Suzuki Cup title for the first time in their history.

Muslim was only 19 when made his senior international debut in 2009. His first tournament action was at 2009 Sea Games. Muslim helps Malaysia to win their fifth Sea Games gold medal. Muslim also played at 2010 Asia Games. Muslim led Malaysia to qualify for the second round of the 2010 Asia Games as one of the best four third-placed teams after a lapse of 32 years.
Muslim was called by Malaysia coach, Dato K. Rajagopal to play at 2010 AFF Suzuki Cup. Malaysia won the 2010 AFF Suzuki Cup title for the first time in their history under the management of Dato K. Rajagopal.

Career statistics

Club

International

Malaysia XI

Honours

International
 2009 SEA Games : Gold
 2010 AFF Suzuki Cup :Winner
 2011 SEA Games : Gold
 2014 AFF Suzuki Cup :Runner Up

Club
Harimau Muda
 Malaysia Premier League (1): 2009

PDRM FA
 Malaysia Premier League (1): 2014

Individual
FAM Football Awards
Best Young Players:2009

References

External links
 
 

1989 births
Living people
Malaysian Muslims
Malaysian footballers
Malaysian people of Malay descent
Malaysia international footballers
People from Terengganu
Terengganu FC players
Johor Darul Ta'zim F.C. players
PDRM FA players
Kelantan FA players
Sri Pahang FC players
Malaysia Super League players
Association football central defenders
Footballers at the 2010 Asian Games
Southeast Asian Games gold medalists for Malaysia
Southeast Asian Games medalists in football
Competitors at the 2011 Southeast Asian Games
Asian Games competitors for Malaysia